Empire Today is an American home improvement and home furnishing company based in Chicago, Illinois, specialising in installed carpet, flooring, and window treatments. The company operates in more than 75 metropolitan areas within the United States, and is most well-known for TV ads featuring a distinctive jingle. The company's name comes from the slogan on some of its commercials, "Empire today, carpeting tomorrow". Empire Today claims that it is the largest in-home sales flooring company in the United States.

History

Empire Today LLC (commonly referred as Empire Today) was founded by entrepreneur Seymour Cohen in 1959. It was initially known as Empire Plastic Covers, a private, family-owned business in Chicago from a small office space. Cohen decided to expand the company's product line in response to growing customer request. In 1965, Empire Plastic Covers changed its name to Empire Home Services, adding carpet to their product line. Over the years, Empire's product line grew, as did the company's national presence. In December 2002, the company was sold, and then in January 2003, adopted its current name: Empire Today.  It was acquired by the investment company Mercury Capital LP. In 2016, the company was sold to H.I.G. Capital, a private equity firm, for an undisclosed amount.

Carpet recycled 
In 2023, Empire Today implemented a carpet and padding recycling program to minimize the environmental impact of their day-to-day operations. All of the padding removed by Empire Today's installers that can be recycled, will be recycled as part of their program in cooperation with Carpet America Effort (CARE) and Carpet Landfill Elimination and Recycling (CLEAR). In first quarter 2023, Empire piloted the program in select areas, and the program is currently operational in more than 25 of Empire's service areas. Since the program's inception, over eight million pounds of carpet and padding have been recycled, according to Empire's waste tonnage reporting.

Adverts
Empire Today's advertising is prevalent throughout major metro areas across North America. The company's television and web ads feature the "Empire Man" character. He was originally portrayed as live-action but is now portrayed as a cartoon character at the end of their advertisements.

Empire old logo

The "Empire Man" was introduced in 1977 as a live action character and later adapted into a popular animated person that has grown to become a cultural icon, especially in the Chicago area. The "Empire Man" has been seen internationally in commercials and other media, has spawned a line of collectible bobblehead dolls and inspired the Chicago Cubs to declare an official "Empire Day" at Wrigley Field in 2007.

The live action "Empire Man" was portrayed on television by Lynn Hauldren, a former ad executive, from 1978 through 2011. After Empire Today retired the live character in favor of a computer-animated version, Hauldren continued to provide voiceovers for the ads until his death in 2011, though ads with his voiceovers continue to air on television. Since 2017 the "Empire Man" has been portrayed by Ryan Salzwedel in various television spots.

Advertising jingle 
Empire Today's advertising jingle, which has been broadcast since 1977, is a widely recognized theme. The jingle is simply a small vocal group singing out the digits of the telephone number and the company name. Lynn Hauldren, a barbershop quartet performer, wrote and sung the tune to accompany the singing of the company's phone number, and recorded the jingle with an a cappella group, the Fabulous 40s. The famous Empire Today advertising jingle has made the Empire Today phone number one of the most recognized numbers in the country.

The jingle was changed in 1995 to include the "(800)" part, and was later changed during 2003, to incorporate the word "Today".

References

External links

Home improvement retailers of the United States
American companies established in 1959
Retail companies established in 1959
Companies based in Cook County, Illinois
Culture of Chicago
1959 establishments in Illinois